Nils Lundell (23 December 1889 – 11 July 1943) was a Swedish actor. He appeared in more than 50 films between 1917 and 1943.

Selected filmography

 Karin Daughter of Ingmar (1920)
 The Mill (1921)
 A Wild Bird (1921)
 A Fortune Hunter (1921)
 The Eyes of Love (1922)
Charles XII's Courier (1924)
 A Maid Among Maids (1924)
 The Österman Brothers' Virago (1925)
 Gustaf Wasa (1928)
 Longing for the Sea (1931)
 Colourful Pages (1931)
 Love and Deficit (1932)
 His Life's Match (1932)
 Black Roses (1932)
 The Women Around Larsson (1934)
 Fired (1934)
 Melody of the Sea (1934)
 Raggen (1936)
 The Quartet That Split Up (1936)
 Sun Over Sweden (1938)
 We at Solglantan (1939)
 The Fight Continues (1941)
 In Paradise (1941)
 If I Could Marry the Minister (1941)
 Tomorrow's Melody (1942)
 The Case of Ingegerd Bremssen (1942)
 Take Care of Ulla (1942)
 The Yellow Clinic (1942)
 The Sin of Anna Lans (1943)
 Captured by a Voice (1943)
 The Sixth Shot (1943)

References

External links

1889 births
1943 deaths
Swedish male film actors
Male actors from Stockholm